Uruli Kanchan is a village 33 km east from the city of Pune in the district of Pune, Maharashtra, India.
The village has been  famous for the last sixty years for the Naturopathy Center (Nisarg Upchar Ashram) started by Mahatma Gandhi and his disciple Manibhai Desai. The village is also the location of the BAIF Development Research Foundation, an NGO started by Manibhai Desai in the 1960s. BAIF is well known throughout India for its program of breeding high yielding livestock and promoting sustainable rural development.

History
Uruli was first mentioned in a copper plate issued by Shilahara king Aparajita in 993 AD. The plate refers to Pune region as Punaka vishaya and included Theur, Uruli, Chorachi Alandi, Bhosari etc. According to Sankhelia , Uruli was called Araluva in these plates but he calls the inscription to be from the Rashtrakuta era rather than the later Shilahara.

Under British colonial rule,  Great Indian Peninsula Railway started train services  between Mumbai and Solapur in December 1858 with Uruli Kanchan as one of the Stations on the route. The Train Station at that time served as a transit point for pilgrims traveling to Jejuri from Uruli using a dirt road. 
The train was also used for transporting Pomegranate to the markets of Poona and Bombay. The annual  Sant Tukaram Maharaj Palkhi procession has been  taking  a halt for lunch in  Uruli en route to Pandharpur in the Hindu Shaka month of Jeshtha for centuries.

The British colonial government set up a relief camp for people affected by the great famine of 1897 in Uruli. The work mainly involved cutting stone from a local quarry. A Grampanchayat or Village Council was established in 1936 with Mr, Pranlal Shah as the first Sarpanch or leader of the council.

Mahatma Gandhi came to Uruli Kanchan on 22 March 1946, & stayed here for 7 days with his young disciple, Manibhai Desai. Manibhai, as has been mentioned before, was instrumental in totally transforming the village over many decades. His first major activity here was to open a Nature cure Ashram which continues to this day and is well known throughout India. This was followed by opening of Schools in Uruli. In 1967, he  founded the Bharatiya Agro-Industries Foundation (BAIF). BAIF has been a pioneer in introducing the Indo-European hybrid cattle breed to India.

Geography
Uruli Kanchan lies 33 km east of the City of Pune. A few kilometers north of the village flows the Mula-Mutha River. A few kilometers south of the village is the Sinhagad - Bhuleshwar mountain range. A road going South connects Uruli with the pilgrim Center of Jejuri on the other side of the mountain range. The area around Uruli receives on average 600 mm of rain per annum. The medium black soil around Uruli is very fertile and irrigation from the mutha canal allows for growing of cash crops.

Demographics
According to the census of India of 2011, the population of the village was 30,305 with 15,687 males and 14,618 females. The number of households in the village was 6,693.
The village is dominated by a number of Maratha  clans on political and economic level. The village also has a significant population of Marwadi and Sindhi people. Both communities dominate trade in the village. The Sindhi families settled into Uruli when they migrated to India from Sindh after Indian independence in 1947. Due to the excellent transport links to Pune, the village also has a sizeable population that commutes to work in Pune Metropolitan Region. The presence of the school, college and BAIF means there is a high proportion of professionals such as teachers, veterinary  doctors, and agricultural scientists residing in the area.

With constant expansion of the Pune Metropolitan Area and the consequent demand for more housing, Uruli Kanchan and surrounding villages are slowly turning into outer suburbs of Pune. A number of Gated communities of High end Apartment blocks are getting built.

Economy

The area around Uruli is irrigated by the Mutha canal and therefore the land is used  for growing cash crops like sugarcane and grapes. The sugarcane is supplied mainly to the sugar mill at Anurag Sugar Factory near Yawat, a 15 km from Uruli. The village holds a weekly open air market on Sunday. The Naturopathy Ashram attracts wealthy patrons from all over India. The cattle breeding program at BAIF attracts professionals from all across India.

In recent years, the village has attracted a number of Household furniture and windows manufacturers, and distributors. Some of these include  Shree Krishna Furniture, Netra Furniture, Akash Furniture. & Aluminium supplier as Pro Aluminium Pvt. Ltd. As Uruli Kanchan is slowly becoming a commuter town for professional people working in Pune, restaurants like Kubera Restaurant & Beer Bar, Sonaee Pure Veg, Elite Food Corner have opened up  to cater for this population and the increasingly affluent local people.

Local Government

A Grampanchayat or Village Council was established in 1936 with Mr, Pranlal Shah as the first Sarpanch or leader of the council. Later Manibhai Desai served as the Sarpanch for a long period. The council has six  wards (Constituencies) that elect a total of 17 members.

Transport

Urali railway station is served by Central Railway's the main Mumbai - Secunderabad line and the Pune -Solapur National highway. There  are  also Local PMPML  bus services  7 / 7A and 9 that go to and from Pune and Hadapsar respectively.

Educational facilities

The oldest school in the village is a Primary School (Elementary School) which was established   in 1881. The school is run by the Pune District Council (Zilla Parishad). The medium of instruction is Marathi. The school occupied the same building as the village Panchayat or the council but recently moved into a  new building.

The local high school, Mahatma Gandhi Vidyalaya is  recognized as a rural center of excellence. The medium of instruction in this school is Marathi. The school is co-educational and has around 3000 students. The school has offered a choice of vocational courses for high school grade students (year 8-10) in Technology and Agriculture for decades. The school also runs a  hostel called Kumar Chhatralaya for around 200 male students from outside the area. There are also schools in the area where the medium of instruction is English. These include Amar Education Institute, Angel High School & Dr. Cyrus Poonawala English Medium School.

The High School shares it campus with Padmashri Manibhai Desai Mahavidyalaya or College. The College  is affiliated to Pune University and offers Bachelor level courses in Arts, Commerce and Sciences.

Naturopathy Ashram

Mahatma Gandhi came to Uruli Kanchan on 22 March 1946  and stayed for up to 30 March 1946. He treated hundreds of patients with the help of Dr. Mehta, Balkoba Bhave, Manibhai Desai, Dr. Sushila Nair and other disciples. On 30 March 1946, Mahatma Gandhi departed for Delhi for the final negotiations with British Government regarding Independent India. Gandhiji founded Nisargopchar Gramsudhar Trust on 1 April 1946, with the help of kind donations in the form of Land by local people like late shri Mahadev Tatyaba Kanchan. The team under the management of Manibhai preached sound health and hygienic practices and also studied various problems in rural areas and identified suitable solutions to uplift the rural poor. The Nature cure therapy at the ashram followed guidelines issued by Gandhiji. They included regulation of diet, fast, sun-bath, fomentations, steam-bath, mud- bandage, massage and non-injurious indigenous herbs

Over last fifty years the Ashram has made remarkable progress. The institute has set up the unique example in the field of Naturopathy i.e. "The way of Life". People from every corner of India and abroad come here and experience the unique drugless holistic approach for management of chronic diseases. Treatment is offered to patients suffering from Arthritis, cardiovascular diseases, diabetes, obesity, bronchitis, skin diseases, asthma. Digestive, gynaecological problems, and neuro muscular disorders. Day in the Ashram begins with prayer & yoga and ends with prayer. Thus along with other physical treatments, psychological and spiritual counseling completes  the treatment plan.

References

Villages in Pune district
Maharashtra